This article contains information about the literary events and publications of 1947.

Events
January – The English actor-manager Geoffrey Kendal arrives in British India with his touring repertory theatre company "Shakespeareana." It will perform Shakespeare in towns and villages there for several decades.
January 29 – Arthur Miller's play All My Sons opens at the Coronet Theater in New York, directed by Elia Kazan and starring Ed Begley, as the writer's first Broadway success.
February 17 – On the death of Montserrat-born British fantasy fiction writer M. P. Shiel aged 81 in Chichester, his supposed title to the Kingdom of Redonda passes to the London poet John Gawsworth.
March – Landfall, a literary magazine, is founded by Charles Brasch and first published by Caxton Press (New Zealand). It will become the country's longest-established literary journal.
April
The opening night of the Swiss dramatist Friedrich Dürrenmatt's first play, Es steht geschrieben (It Is Written), is held in the Schauspielhaus Zürich, provoking fights among the audience.
The discovery of the Dead Sea Scrolls at the Qumran Caves becomes public.
April 6 – The 1st Tony Awards for excellence in live American theater are awarded at the Waldorf Astoria New York.
April 24 – American novelist Willa Cather dies aged 73 of a cerebral hemorrhage in her home at 570 Park Avenue in Manhattan. On her death, her long-time domestic partner, magazine editor Edith Lewis, destroys the uncompleted manuscript of Cather's historical novel Hard Punishments according to the author's instructions.
May – Dorothy Parker divorces Alan Campbell for the first time.
May/June – The English novelist T. H. White buys a house in Saint Anne, Alderney in the Channel Islands, where he will spend the rest of his life.
June – Publication begins of Vice Versa magazine in Los Angeles, the first known periodical for lesbians, edited by 'Lisa Ben'.
June 24 – Kenneth Arnold claims to have seen nine flying saucers near Mount Rainier, Washington, starting a wave of enthusiasm in science fiction writers and scientists.
June 25 – Most of The Diary of a Young Girl by Anne Frank is first published as Het Achterhuis: Dagboekbrieven 14 juni 1942 – 1 augustus 1944 ("The Annex: Diary Notes from 14 June 1942 – 1 August 1944") in Amsterdam, two years after its writer's death in Bergen-Belsen concentration camp.
July 
Jack Kerouac begins the journey he will later chronicle in his book On the Road.
Pramoedya Ananta Toer begins two years' imprisonment by the Dutch authorities in Jakarta for supporting the Indonesian National Revolution. While in prison he begins his first major novel, Perburuan (The Fugitive, 1950).
August 24 – The first Edinburgh Festival of the Arts opens in Scotland.
September – The German literary association Group 47 forms.
September 12 – The American novelist John Dos Passos is involved in an automobile accident that kills his wife and costs him the sight in one eye.
November – Muriel Spark becomes editor of Poetry Review in London from this month's issue.
November 24 – Dalton Trumbo refuses to testify before the McCarthyite House Un-American Activities Committee. Ring Lardner, Jr. attends, but refuses to answer questions. The United States House of Representatives votes 346–17 to approve citations of Contempt of Congress against all the "Hollywood Ten" screenwriters and directors who refuse to cooperate with the Committee over allegations of communist influences in the movie business. The ten are blacklisted by the Hollywood movie studios the following day.
December 23 – Tennessee Williams' play A Streetcar Named Desire opens at the Ethel Barrymore Theatre on Broadway in New York City, directed by Elia Kazan. It stars Jessica Tandy and Marlon Brando in his first major stage rôle.
Uncertain dates
Woody Guthrie completes his novel House of Earth. It will not be published until 2013.
Séamus Ó Néill's novel Tonn Tuile is the first book from the Irish language publisher Sáirséal agus Dill in Dublin.

New books

Fiction
Nelson Algren – The Neon Wilderness (short stories)
 Thomas Armstrong – King Cotton
Cynthia Asquith – This Mortal Coil
Carolyn Sherwin Bailey – Miss Hickory
Nigel Balchin – Lord, I Was Afraid
H.E. Bates – The Purple Plain
François Boyer – Les Jeux inconnus
Ray Bradbury – Dark Carnival (debut)
John Horne Burns – The Gallery
Italo Calvino – The Path to the Nest of Spiders (Il sentiero dei nidi di ragno)
Victor Canning – The Chasm
Albert Camus – The Plague (La Peste)
John Dickson Carr
The Sleeping Sphinx
Dr. Fell, Detective, and Other Stories
Peter Cheyney 
 Dance Without Music
 Dark Interlude
Agatha Christie – The Labours of Hercules
 Alec Coppel – A Man About a Dog
Thomas B. Costain – The Moneyman
Edmund Crispin – Swan Song
Johan Daisne – The Man Who Had His Hair Cut Short (De man die zijn haar kort liet knippen)
 Marcia Davenport – East Side, West Side
 Cecil Day-Lewis – Minute for Murder
Hans Fallada (died February 5) – Every Man Dies Alone (Jeder stirbt für sich allein)
Jean Genet – Querelle de Brest
 Anthony Gilbert – Death in the Wrong Room
Jean Giono – Un Roi sans divertissement
Winston Graham – Take My Life
L. P. Hartley – Eustace and Hilda
Robert A. Heinlein – Rocket Ship Galileo
Dorothy B. Hughes – In a Lonely Place (novel)
Hammond Innes 
Killer Mine
The Lonely Skier
Michael Innes – A Night of Errors
Carl Jacobi – Revelations in Black
Yasunari Kawabata (川端 康成) – Snow Country (雪国, Yukiguni)
Hans Keilson – Komödie in Moll (Comedy in a Minor Key)
Jacques Laurent – Darling Caroline
Fritz Leiber, Jr. – Night's Black Agents
Alexander Lernet-Holenia – Twentieth of July
E. C. R. Lorac – Relative to Poison
Malcolm Lowry – Under the Volcano
Thomas Mann – Doctor Faustus (Doktor Faustus: Das Leben des deutschen Tonsetzers Adrian Leverkühn, erzählt von einem Freunde)
Gabriel García Márquez – Eyes of a Blue Dog (Ojos de perro azul)
 Ngaio Marsh – Final Curtain
W. Somerset Maugham – Creatures of Circumstance (short stories)
Oscar Micheaux – Masquerade, a Historical Novel
James A. Michener – Tales of the South Pacific
Gladys Mitchell – Death and the Maiden
W. O. Mitchell – Who Has Seen the Wind?
Alberto Moravia – The Woman of Rome (La Romana)
Willard Motley – Knock On Any Door
Vladimir Nabokov – Bend Sinister
Cesare Pavese – Il compagno
Gerard Reve (as Simon van het Reve) – De Avonden (The Evenings)
Kenneth Roberts – Lydia Bailey
Michael Sadleir – Forlorn Sunset
Samuel Shellabarger – Prince of Foxes
Mickey Spillane – I, the Jury
John Steinbeck
The Pearl
The Wayward Bus
Rex Stout – Too Many Women
Cecil Street 
 Death of an Author
 Nothing But the Truth
Julian Symons – A Man Called Jones
Phoebe Atwood Taylor (as Alice Tilton) – The Iron Clew
Philip Toynbee – Tea with Mrs Goodman
Boris Vian
Autumn in Peking (L'Automne à Pékin)
Froth on the Daydream (L'Écume des jours)
(as Vernon Sullivan) – The Dead All Have the Same Skin (Les Morts ont tous la même peau)
Evelyn Waugh – Scott-King's Modern Europe
Jack Williamson – With Folded Hands
 Frank Yerby – The Vixens

Children and young people
Dora Birtles – Pioneer Shack
William Pène du Bois – The Twenty-One Balloons
Margaret Wise Brown – Goodnight Moon
Edgar Rice Burroughs – Tarzan and the Foreign Legion
Nan Chauncy – They Found a Cave
Rumer Godden – The Doll's House
Clare Hoskyns-Abrahall – Prelude (biography)
James Lennox Kerr (as Peter Dawlish) – Dauntless Finds Her Crew (first in the Dauntless series of at least eight books)
Betty MacDonald – Mrs. Piggle-Wiggle (first in a series of four books)
Walter de la Mare – Collected Stories for Children
Laurence Meynell (as A. Stephen Tring) – The Old Gang
Arthur Ransome – Great Northern?
Frank Richards – Billy Bunter of Greyfriars School
Charles Green Shaw – It Looked Like Spilt Milk

Drama
Jean Anouilh – Invitation to the Castle (L'Invitation au Château)
Pralhad Keshav Atre – Moruchi Mavshi (adaptation of Charley's Aunt)
Ugo Betti – Ispezione (The Inquiry)
Maurice Clavel – Les Incendiaires
William Douglas-Home 
 The Chiltern Hundreds
 Now Barabbas
Jean Genet – The Maids (Les Bonnes)
Patrick Hastings – The Blind Goddess
 Ian Hay 
 Hattie Stowe
 Off the Record
Noel Langley and Robert Morley – Edward, My Son
Arthur Miller – All My Sons
Ena Lamont Stewart – Men Should Weep
John Van Druten – The Druid Circle
 A.R. Whatmore – She Wanted a Cream Front Door
Tennessee Williams – A Streetcar Named Desire

Poetry
Kingsley Amis – Bright November
Cairo poets, edited by Keith Bullen and John Cromer – Salamander: A Miscellany of Poetry
Aimé Césaire – Cahier d'un retour au pays natal (Notebook of a Return to the Native Land; expanded in book format)
August Derleth (editor) – Dark of the Moon: Poems of Fantasy and the Macabre
Abba Kovner – Ad Lo-Or (Until No-Light)
Philip Larkin – A Girl in Winter
Louis MacNeice – The Dark Tower
Shinoe Shōda (正田 篠枝) – Sange

Non-fiction
Simone de Beauvoir – The Ethics of Ambiguity (Pour une Morale de l'ambiguïté)
Cleanth Brooks – The Well Wrought Urn: Studies in the Structure of Poetry
L. Sprague de Camp – The Evolution of Naval Weapons
Bernard DeVoto – Across the Wide Missouri
Benjamin Fondane (posthumous) – Baudelaire et l'expérience du gouffre
Anne Frank (posthumous) – The Diary of a Young Girl
George Gamow – One Two Three... Infinity
Jacquetta Hawkes and Christopher Hawkes – Prehistoric Britain
Primo Levi – If This Is a Man (Se questo è un uomo)
Walter Lippmann – The Cold War
George Orwell – Lear, Tolstoy and the Fool
Nicolae Petrescu-Comnen – Preludi del grande dramma
Samuel Putnam – Paris Was Our Mistress: Memoirs of a Lost & Found Generation
Franz Rosenthal – The Technique and Approach of Muslim Scholarship
Hugh Trevor-Roper – The Last Days of Hitler
A. L. Zissu – Nu există cult mozaic (No Such Thing as a Mosaic Religion)

Births
January 14 – Richard Laymon, American suspense novelist (died 2001)
February 3 – Paul Auster, American novelist
February 9 – Eamon Duffy, Irish church historian and academic
March 22 – James Patterson, American novelist and short story writer
April 3 – Srikrishna Alanahalli, Indian novelist and poet (died 1989)
April 12 – Tom Clancy, American novelist (died 2013)
April 18 – Kathy Acker (Karen Lehmann), American novelist and poet (died 1997)
April 24 – Astrid Roemer, Suriname-born Dutch novelist, poet and playwright
April 28 – Humayun Azad, Bangladeshi author, poet, scholar and linguist (died 2004)
May 10 – Thomas Tessier, American writer of horror novels and short stories
May 12 – Catherine Yronwode, American author and illustrator
May 27 – Felix Dennis, English publisher and poet (died 2014)
June 5 – David Hare, English playwright
June 19 – Salman Rushdie, Indian novelist writing in English
June 22 – Octavia E. Butler, American science fiction writer (died 2006)
July 2 – Jürg Amann, Swiss dramatist (died 2013)
July 18 – Dermot Healy, Irish novelist and poet (died 2014)
July 23 – Gardner Dozois, American science fiction author and editor (died 2018)
August 14 - Danielle Steel, American romance novelist
August 23 – Willy Russell, English dramatist
September 8 – Marianne Wiggins, American novelist
September 21 – Stephen King, American novelist
October 14 – Tomás de Mattos, Uruguayan writer and librarian (died 2016)
October 19 – Giorgio Cavazzano, Italian comics artist and illustrator
October 26 – Trevor Joyce, Irish poet
November 6 – Michelle Magorian, English children's author
November 14 – P. J. O'Rourke, American political satirist and journalist (died 2022)
November 28 – Gustav Hasford, American marine, novelist, journalist, poet and book thief (died 1993)
December 26 – Jean Echenoz, French novelist
unknown dates
Jaume Cabré, Catalan Spanish novelist and screenwriter
Shahid Nadeem, Pakistani playwright
Borka Pavićević, Montenegrin dramatist and columnist (died 2019)

Deaths
January 19 – Manuel Machado, Spanish poet (born 1874)
February 1 – J. D. Beresford, English short-story writer (born 1873)
February 4 – Margaret Cameron, American novelist, humorist, playwright, non-fiction writer (born 1867)
February 5 – Hans Fallada, German novelist (born 1893)
February 11 – E. M. Hull, English romance novelist (born 1880)
February 15 – Margaret Marshall Saunders, Canadian author (born 1861)
March 12 – Winston Churchill, American novelist (born 1871)
March 13 – Angela Brazil, English school-story writer for girls (born 1868)
April 24 – Willa Cather, American novelist (born 1873)
April 30 – Anna Wickham (Edith Alice Mary Harper), English poet (suicide, born 1883) 
May 21
Flora Thompson, English semi-autobiographical novelist (born 1876)
E. C. Vivian (Charles Henry Cannell), English genre novelist (born 1882)
June 6 – James Agate, English author and critic (born 1877)
June 17 – Maxwell Perkins, American literary editor (born 1884)
August 5 – Herbert Asquith, English poet and novelist (born 1881)
August 30 – Jessie Wilson Manning, American author and lecturer (born 1855)
September 25 – Afevork Ghevre Jesus, Ethiopian author writing in Amharic (born 1868)
September 26 – Hugh Lofting, English-born children's writer (born 1886)
September 15 – Richard Le Gallienne, English writer and poet (born 1866)
October 13
William Le Queux, English-born French novelist and writer (born 1864)
Sidney Webb, English political economist (born 1859)
November 12 – Baroness Orczy (Emma Orczy), Hungarian novelist writing in English (born 1865)
November 14 – Marie Adelaide Belloc Lowndes, Anglo-French novelist and biographer writing in English (born 1868)
November 20 – Wolfgang Borchert, German author and playwright (liver failure, born 1921)
December 7 – Tristan Bernard, French playwright and novelist (born 1866)
December 15 – Arthur Machen, Welsh journalist, novelist and short-story writer (born 1863)
December 30 – Alfred North Whitehead, English mathematician and philosopher (born 1861)

Awards
Carnegie Medal for children's literature: Walter de la Mare, Collected Stories for Children
Frost Medal: Gustav Davidson
James Tait Black Memorial Prize for fiction: L. P. Hartley, Eustace and Hilda
James Tait Black Memorial Prize for biography: Rev. C. C. E. Raven, English Naturalists from Neckham to Ray
Knight Bachelor: Ralph Richardson
Newbery Medal for children's literature: Carolyn Sherwin Bailey, Miss Hickory
Nobel Prize for literature: André Gide
Premio Nadal: Miguel Delibes, La sombra del ciprés es alargada
Pulitzer Prize for Drama: no award given
Pulitzer Prize for Poetry: Robert Lowell: Lord Weary's Castle
Pulitzer Prize for the Novel: Robert Penn Warren – All the King's Men

References

 
Years of the 20th century in literature